Tipu is a Mayan archaeological site in the Maya Mountains near the Belize–Guatemala border. This site is situated near the Macal River. Further downstream is located the Mayan site of Chaa Creek. Slightly further downstream is the site of Cahal Pech. In Spanish colonial times, Tipu is thought to have played a major role in delaying the conquest of Peten.

Notes and references

Short citations

Full citations 

 
 
 
 

Maya sites in Belize